The 1963 Pacific hurricane season was a below-average season, with 8 storms and 4 hurricanes forming. The season ran through the summer and fall of 1963.

The strongest of these storms were Glenda and Mona, which both had  winds. The first storm, Emily, made landfall near Manzanillo, Mexico as a Category 1 hurricane. The next hurricanes, Florence and Glenda, stayed far away from land. Jennifer-Katherine made landfall on Baja California as a tropical depression on September 18. Tropical Storm Irah affected Hawaii as a tropical depression. An unnamed tropical storm curved round Hawaii from 2–8 August. Lillian became post-tropical shortly before making landfall on September 29 with winds of 50 mph. Mona, the final storm of the season made landfall around about the same area as Lillian did with winds of 85 mph.


Systems 
Timeline of activity in the 1963 Pacific hurricane season

Hurricane Emily 

Hurricane Emily formed on June 29, while moving west. It then turned to the north and dissipated over the mountainous regions of Mexico.

Hurricane Florence 

Hurricane Florence followed a nearly-due west track, as it persisted to move away from land, and eventually weakened and dissipated without any effects on a landmass.

Hurricane Glenda 

Hurricane Glenda stayed at sea.

Tropical Storm Four 

Tropical Storm Four stayed over the ocean. Several vessels encountered gale-force winds in this storm from the 8th through the 10th as it proceeded northward across the shipping lanes. On August 12, the remnants of the cyclone dissipated near 50N 165W.

Tropical Storm Jennifer–Katherine 

Tropical Storm Jennifer–Katherine moved through the Eastern Pacific in mid-September. It moved northward, and hit Baja California on September 18, bringing heavy rain to Southern California. A total of  fell in the mountains of southern California from the storm. The storm had two names operationally because the NHC had assumed that Jennifer dissipated and that Katherine was a new storm, but reanalysis revealed that it was one storm.

Tropical Storm Irah 

Irah peaked at a tropical storm and made a direct hit on Hawaii as a tropical depression.

Tropical Storm Lillian 

Tropical Storm Lillian paralleled the Mexican coast. It was originally moving to the north-west, but turned to the west-northeast on September 28, before making landfall on Western Mexico as a tropical storm.

Hurricane Mona 

Hurricane Mona hit western Mexico on October 19.

Storm names 
The following names were used for named storms that formed in the eastern Pacific in 1963. No names were retired from this list. This is a part of list 2, which was used from 1960–1965. Names that were not assigned are marked in gray.

See also 
 1963 Atlantic hurricane season
 1963 Pacific typhoon season
 1963 North Indian Ocean cyclone season
 Australian region cyclone seasons: 1962–63 1963–64
 South Pacific cyclone seasons: 1962–63 1963–64
 South-West Indian Ocean cyclone seasons: 1962–63 1963–64

References 

 
Pacific hurricane seasons
Articles which contain graphical timelines